Vigilante, later released on video as Street Gang, is a 1982 American vigilante film directed by William Lustig and starring Robert Forster and Fred Williamson. Lustig came upon the idea for the film through a news article about "a group of blue collar workers in southern New Jersey who had organized to fight crime in their neighborhood".

Plot 
Eddie Marino (Robert Forster) is a factory worker in New York City. He has a wife named Vickie (Rutanya Alda) and an eight-year-old son named Scott (Dante Joseph). Eddie's friend and co-worker, Nick (Fred Williamson), and two other co-workers, Burke and Ramon, have formed a secret vigilante group because Nick and the group are fed up with the crime in their neighborhoods. Nick and his group are also tired of the police, because the police always fail to protect people. Nick's "group" has support of various residents of the neighborhood who indirectly help them. In one example, a local thug stalks and chases a young woman to a rooftop of an apartment building where the thug robs and then kills her. An old lady who witnesses the thug says nothing to the police, but points out the thug to Nick and his group the next day. Nick and his friends forcibly grab the thug off the streets and place him in their van and drive away. The thug is later found dead in a vacant lot with all of his arms and legs broken and his head bashed in.

One evening, Eddie returns home from work only to discover that Vickie has been stabbed, and Scott has been shot dead in a home invasion which was in retaliation for Vickie aiding a gas station attendant who was being assaulted earlier. Frederico "Rico" Melendez (Willie Colón), the punk leader of a Puerto Rican street gang, is arrested for the crime. Assistant District Attorney Mary Fletcher (Carol Lynley) seeks a lengthy jail sentence, since New York does not have the death penalty. Nick tries to convince Eddie to join the vigilante group, but Eddie turns Nick down, preferring to let the courts handle Rico. Nick's lack of faith in the system is proven correct when Rico is set free after his right-hand man, Prago (Don Blakely), bribes both Judge Sinclair (Vincent Beck) and Eisenburg (Joe Spinell), Rico's attorney. Enraged, Eddie attacks the judge and is sentenced to 30 days in jail.

With Eddie in jail, the vigilante group tracks down the source of the drugs in their neighborhood. After roughing up a small-time drug dealer (Frank Pesce) and torturing his supplier, they are led to a high-ranking member of the New York mayor's office. Meanwhile, in prison, Eddie befriends an inmate named Rake (Woody Strode) who saves him from being gang raped in the showers. As soon as Eddie is released from jail, he joins the vigilante group so he can track down and kill Rico, Prago, and Judge Sinclair. Eddie, Nick, Burke and Ramon confront Rico in his seedy apartment, where Rico denies killing Eddie's son and insists it was Prago. An unmoved Eddie shoots him dead, but narrowly escapes death when Rico's girlfriend attempts to shoot him; she wounds Burke instead, and Nick kills her in self-defense. Upon hearing about Rico's death, Prago takes over command of the gang and mistakenly assumes that dirty cops killed Rico. The following night, Prago and the gang ambush a police car and kill both cops.

Vickie is released from the hospital, but refuses to come home to Eddie and she leaves him, unable to be in the very house where their son was killed. Eddie decides to move away, too, disgusted with himself over killing a man as well as in fear that the gang will track him down. Nick unsuccessfully attempts to persuade him to stay and fight. As Eddie leaves Brooklyn, he recognizes Prago and follows him on foot. Prago soon spots Eddie and they shoot at each other. Prago hijacks a car, and Eddie steals a car to follow him. The chase leads to a local dockyard mill where both cars crash. Eddie chases Prago on foot again, then confronts him on a storage tower. Sadistic and insane to the last, Prago admits to killing Scott, and then dares Eddie to kill him; Eddie responds by throwing Prago off the tower to his death without hesitating.  Later, Eddie plants a bomb in Judge Sinclair's car, then watches from a distance as it explodes and kills Sinclair. The film ends as Eddie drives away to an unknown destination.

Cast
 Robert Forster as Eddie Marino
 Fred Williamson as Nick
 Richard Bright as Burke
 Rutanya Alda as Vickie Marino
 Don Blakely as Prago
 Joseph Carberry as Ramon
 Willie Colón as Rico
 Joe Spinell as Eisenberg
 Carol Lynley as Mary Fletcher
 Frank Pesce as Blueboy
 Steve James as Ptl. Gibbons (as Steve W. James)
 Woody Strode as Rake
 Vincent Beck as Judge Sinclair

Release 
Vigilante premiered at the Cannes Film Festival on May 18, 1982. This was followed by a sneak preview in New York City on July 23, 1982 and a wide release in the United States on March 4, 1983. It grossed $5,091,888 in the United States.

Blue Underground released it on Blu-ray for the first time in September 2010, and again on Ultra HD Blu-ray in December 2020, boasting a new 16-bit restoration from the original camera negative, HDR10 and Dolby Vision, and a new Dolby Atmos soundtrack.

Reception 
Dave Kehr of The New York Times wrote that Vigilante was "directed with classical, self-effacing skill". Kehr identified influence from New York street realism and stated that the film was only possible in the period between the collapses of the Motion Picture Production Code and grindhouse theaters. Randy Fox of the Nashville Scene called the film "a grindhouse classic". Rodney Perkins of Twitch Film called it derivative of Death Wish but memorable for its cast and nihilistic tone. Chris Claro of DVD Verdict called it an incoherent ripoff of Death Wish that is still entertaining. Stuart Galbraith of DVD Talk rated it 2.5/5 stars and called it "an undistinguished, forgettable throwaway".

See also
List of films featuring home invasions
List of hood films

References

External links
 
 

1980s crime films
1980s vigilante films
1982 films
American action thriller films
American crime films
American independent films
American vigilante films
Films directed by William Lustig
Films scored by Jay Chattaway
Films set in New York City
1980s English-language films
1980s American films